Doug Shipley  (born June 10, 1966) is a Canadian politician who was elected to represent the riding of Barrie—Springwater—Oro-Medonte in the House of Commons of Canada in the 2019 Canadian federal election. He previously served on the Barrie City Council for Ward 3 from 2010 to 2019.

Electoral record

References

External links

Living people
Conservative Party of Canada MPs
Members of the House of Commons of Canada from Ontario
Barrie city councillors
Year of birth uncertain
1966 births